Abdul Musawir is an Indonesian footballer who currently plays for Persiraja Banda Aceh in the Liga Indonesia Premier Division as a winger.

References
Abdul Musawir at ligaprima.co.id
Abdul Musawir at goal.com

Indonesian footballers
1984 births
Living people
People from Banda Aceh
Sportspeople from Aceh
Persiraja Banda Aceh players
PSIM Yogyakarta players
Indonesian Premier Division players
Association football wingers